Desmond Fitzgerald or FitzGerald may refer to:

 Desmond FitzGerald, 28th Knight of Glin (1901–1949), Anglo-Irish nobleman
 Desmond John Villiers FitzGerald, Knight of Glin (1937–2011), Irish author
 Desmond FitzGerald (politician) (1888–1947), Irish revolutionary and politician
 Desmond Fitzgerald (CIA officer) (1910–1967), American espionage officer
Desmond FitzGerald (architect) (1911–1987), Irish architect
 Desmond Fitzgerald (professor) (born 1953), president of the University of Limerick
 Desmond G. Fitzgerald (1834–1905), English electrician and spiritualist